Infatuation is a 1925 American silent drama film directed by Irving Cummings and starring Corinne Griffith, Percy Marmont, and Warner Oland. It is an adaptation of the 1919 play Caesar's Wife by Somerset Maugham.

Plot
As described in a film magazine review, neglected by her husband Sir Arthur Little during his assignment in Cairo, Violet seeks the company of Ronald Perry, Sir Arthur's secretary. Parry's sister, sensing the romance, arranges to have Parry transferred from Egypt to Paris. However, Parry remains in Cairo, and indications are that Sir Arthur has lost the love of his wife forever. Violet then hears of a plan to assassinate Sir Arthur, and suddenly realizes that she loves her husband. She takes actions that save his life, and a reconciliation between the married couple follows.

Cast

References

Bibliography
 Goble, Alan. The Complete Index to Literary Sources in Film. Walter de Gruyter, 1999.

External links

Still at www.silentfilmstillarchive.com

1925 films
1925 drama films
Silent American drama films
Films directed by Irving Cummings
American silent feature films
First National Pictures films
Films set in London
1920s American films